Pseudotocinclus juquiae is a species of armored catfish endemic to Brazil where it is known from a few localities of the Juquiá River basin. The type locality, a small creek in Juquitiba, is clear, with a slow current, mud, and in some places, sand on the bottom. Marginal vegetation includes a small area of pastures, small trees and shrubs. P. juquiae has also been found in the ribeirão Poço Grande, a tributary on the right margin of the Juquiá River; this locality, an old swamp area near the city of Juquiá, is heavily impacted by human activities, and is also used for garbage and sewage disposal.

References
 

Otothyrinae
Fish of South America
Fish of Brazil
Endemic fauna of Brazil
Taxa named by Adriana Kazue Takako
Taxa named by Claudio Oliveira (scientist)
Taxa named by Osvaldo Takeshi Oyakawa
Fish described in 2005